Bartolomé Revilla y San José (August 24, 1867 – May 7, 1922) was a Filipino lawyer, judge, law professor and politician.

Revilla was the first Representative of the 2nd district of the newly created province of Rizal during the 1st Philippine Legislature from 1907 to 1909. He also served as a judge in several Philippine provinces.

Early life  
Revilla was born on August 24, 1867 in San Miguel, Bulacan in what was then the Spanish colony of the Philippines.  He was one of six children born to Don Ceferino Revilla and Rosenda San Jose, Revilla spent most of his childhood in the Santa Cruz district of Manila. Revilla learned to read and write under the tutelage of his uncle, Teodoro Revilla Jr., a priest.

Revilla attended the Colegio de San Juan de Letran in Manila for his secondary education and then the University of Santo Tomas, where he completed his law degree in 1894.

According to  Album Historico de la Primera Asamblea Filipina of 1907 (Worcester Philippine Collection, Library of the University of Michigan and compiled by Anthony R. Tuohy), Revilla served as Lieutenant in the legal corps of the Philippine Revolutionary Army under Gen. Emilio Aguinaldo during the Philippine Revolution against Spain.

Legal career 
In 1901, the American-run Insular Government of the Philippine Islands reorganized the Judiciary system and appointed lawyers as judges. Revilla was appointed  the Secretary of the Department of Public Prosecution. During this same time, he became a Professor of Law at the new Escuela De Derecho (present-day Manila Law College).

From 1901 to 1906, Revilla served as fiscal and judge of the court of first instance in several provinces (from the Report of the Philippine Commission to the US Secretary of War 1901). Revilla worked closely with future president Manuel L. Quezon in Tayabas (present-day province of Quezon), where Bartolome was Court of First Instance judge and Quezon was its governor.

Political career 
It is presumed that in 1907, Quezon asked Revilla to run for the Philippine Assembly. Both men were members of the  Partido Nacional Progresista, prior to the 1907 elections for the Philippine Assembly. Revilla became the Representative of Rizal's 2nd district, the first person to hold that office. .

As a Representative, Revilla belonged to the following committees: Appropriation, Civil Service, Elections and Revision of Laws. Finishing his term as Representative in 1909, he chose not to run for re-election and instead went back to the judiciary.

Revilla was married to Doña Vitaliana Revilla of Pasig and had eight children. He was also the brother of educator, Susana Revilla (co-founder of Instituto de Mujeres in Manila).

Revilla died in 1922 in Manila.

Bibliography
Cullinane, Michael (1989). Ilustrado Politics: Filipino Elite Responses to American Rule, 1898-1908. Ateneo de Manila University Press.

References

External links
Escuela De Derecho
Lawlist.chanrobles.com
Archive.org on the 1st Philippine Assembly
Archive.org
Archive.org
Archive.org
 Directorio biografico filipino, contiene las biografias de la intelectualidad Filipina, magistrados de la Corte suprema y jueces de primera instancia, miembros de la legislatura, altos funcionarios publicos y distinguidos, abogados y medicos Filipinos. P. Reyes y c.a, editores.

19th-century Filipino lawyers
20th-century Filipino judges
Members of the House of Representatives of the Philippines from Rizal
People from San Miguel, Bulacan
People from Santa Cruz, Manila
1867 births
1922 deaths
University of Santo Tomas alumni
Members of the Philippine Legislature